Lesser Slave Lake is a provincial electoral district for the Legislative Assembly of Alberta, Canada.  It has existed since 1971 and is mandated to return a single member using the first past the post method of voting.

The riding is named after the lake of the same name, which is located entirely within its borders.

Geography
Lesser Slave Lake is a predominantly rural riding located in Northern Alberta.

There are no cities in the riding. It includes only two incorporated urban municipalities: the towns of High Prairie and Slave Lake. The riding also includes the entirety of one rural municipality (the Municipal District of Opportunity No. 17) and parts of three others (Big Lakes County, the Municipal District of Lesser Slave River No. 124, and Northern Sunrise County).

Eleven First Nation bands are based in Lesser Slave Lake: Bigstone Cree Nation, Driftpile First Nation, Kapawe'no First Nation, Loon River Cree Nation, Lubicon Lake Indian Nation, Peerless Trout First Nation, Sawridge First Nation, Sucker Creek Cree First Nation, Swan River First Nation, Whitefish Lake First Nation, and Woodland Cree First Nation. Most of the region's Indigenous population is of Cree origin.

The riding borders five other electoral districts: Peace River to the northwest, Fort McMurray-Wood Buffalo to the northeast, Fort McMurray-Lac La Biche to the east, Athabasca-Barrhead-Westlock to the south, and Central Peace-Notley to the west.

History
The electoral district was created in the 1971 boundary re-distribution from the electoral districts of Grouard and Peace River. The district remained largely unchanged until the 1993 boundary re-distribution when the electoral district was extended north to the Northwest Territories, Alberta border.

The 2003 boundary re-distribution saw the district revert to similar boundaries that existed prior to 1993. The 2010 boundary re-distribution saw the district re-aligned with current municipal boundaries with a portion of land on the south end moved into Barrhead-Morinville-Westlock.

In the 2017 electoral boundary re-distribution only minor changes were made to the districts boundaries, which were enlarged to include the Calling Lake Reserve.

Lesser Slave Lake is one of two electoral districts in the province that are afforded the exemption provided in the Electoral Boundaries Commission Act whereby only four electoral districts in Alberta may have a population which is as much as 50% below the average population of all the proposed electoral districts. The rationale for this exemption is the relatively low population in the region and large distances between population centers. The total population of the district in the 2017 re-distribution was 27,818 which is 41% below the provincial average for electoral districts.

Boundary history

Representation history

The electoral district was created in 1971. Prior to the districts creation the area had elected Social Credit MLA's. The first election saw a tight race between Social Credit candidate Dennis Barton and Progressive Conservative candidate Garth Roberts. Barton eked out a win with just 41% of the popular vote.

Barton would be defeated in the 1975 election by Progressive Conservative candidate Larry Shaben who rolled up a landslide majority. Shaben would serve four terms in office and hold three different cabinet portfolios under the governments of Peter Lougheed and Don Getty before retiring from office in 1989.

The third representative of the riding was Progressive Conservative candidate Pearl Calahasen who was elected to her first term in 1989 in a tight three-way race winning less than half the popular vote. She would also serve some ministerial portfolios from 1996 to 2006 in the government of Ralph Klein. She represented the district for seven terms, becoming the longest-serving female MLA in Alberta history, as well as the longest-serving Indigenous MLA.

In the 2015 election, Calahasen placed third of three candidates and was defeated by the NDP's Danielle Larivee, who served in several ministerial portfolios during the 29th Assembly.

Legislature results

Elections in the 1970s

|}

|}

|}

Elections in the 1980s

|}

|}

|}

Elections in the 1990s

|}

|}

Elections in the 2000s

|}

|}

|}

Elections in the 2010s

Senate nominee results

2004 Senate nominee election district results
Voters had the option of selecting 4 Candidates on the Ballot

2012 Senate nominee election district results

Student Vote results

2004 elections

On November 19, 2004 a Student Vote was conducted at participating Alberta schools to parallel the 2004 Alberta general election results. The vote was designed to educate students and simulate the electoral process for persons who have not yet reached the legal majority. The vote was conducted in 80 of the 83 provincial electoral districts with students voting for actual election candidates. Schools with a large student body that reside in another electoral district had the option to vote for candidates outside of the electoral district then where they were physically located.

2012 elections

References

External links 
Website of the Legislative Assembly of Alberta

Alberta provincial electoral districts